Dimitris Moustakas is a Greek lawyer and judge who served as the Minister of Labour and Social Solidarity in the Caretaker Cabinet of Vassiliki Thanou-Christophilou.

Early life and education

Moustakas was born in Euboea and studied law the University of Athens.

Professional career

Moustakas joined the judiciary in 1975 and is currently a senior judge. He has edited the literary column of the Legal News, published by the Association of Judges and Prosecutors.

Political career

Moustakas was appointed as the Minister of Labour and Social Solidarity in the Caretaker Cabinet of Vassiliki Thanou-Christophilou on 28 August 2015.

Personal life
Moustakas has published three collections of poetry, one of which was for children. In 2001 he was awarded the first prize in National Short Story Literary Contest of the Philological Department of Piraeus Association and in 2008 he was awarded the second prize for poetry in nationwide poetry contest of Writers' Union of Northern Greece.

References

Living people
Labour ministers of Greece
20th-century Greek judges
National and Kapodistrian University of Athens alumni
Greek male poets
21st-century Greek poets
21st-century Greek male writers
Year of birth missing (living people)
People from Euboea (regional unit)
21st-century Greek judges